David Nosek (born February 19, 1981) is a Czech professional ice hockey defenceman. He played with HC Karlovy Vary in the Czech Extraliga during the 2010–11 Czech Extraliga season.

References

External links

1981 births
Czech ice hockey defencemen
HC Karlovy Vary players
Living people
Czech expatriate ice hockey players in Russia
Sportspeople from Olomouc
HC Oceláři Třinec players
PSG Berani Zlín players